Västmanland County is a county or län in central Sweden. It borders the counties of Södermanland, Örebro, Gävleborg, Dalarna and Uppsala. The county also has a stretch of shoreline towards Mälaren (Sweden's third largest lake).

Province
For history, geography and culture, see: Västmanland (Westmannia)

Administration
The main aim of the County Administrative Board is to fulfil the goals set in  national politics by the Riksdag and the Government, to coordinate the interests of the county, to promote the development of the county, to establish regional goals and safeguard the due process of law in the handling of each case. The County Administrative Board is a Government Agency headed by a Governor. See List of Västmanland Governors.

Politics
The County Council of Västmanland or Landstinget Västmanland.

Riksdag elections
The table details all Riksdag election results of Västmanland County since the unicameral era began in 1970. The blocs denote which party would support the Prime Minister or the lead opposition party towards the end of the elected parliament.

Municipalities
The lake at the lower right is Mälaren; at the lower left is Hjälmaren.

Arboga
Fagersta
Hallstahammar
Kungsör
Köping
Norberg
Sala
Skinnskatteberg
Surahammar
Västerås

Demographics

Foreign background 
SCB have collected statistics on backgrounds of residents since 2002. These tables consist of all who have two foreign-born parents or are born abroad themselves. The chart lists election years and the last year on record alone. Heby Municipality was  included in the 2002 overall statistics, since it was part of the county at the time.

Heraldry

The County of Västmanland inherited its coat of arms from the province of Västmanland. When it is shown with a royal crown it represents the County Administrative Board.

Sports

Football in the county is administered by Västmanlands Fotbollförbund. Bandy is also popular, with the most successful Swedish team Västerås SK. Several Bandy World Championship finals have been played in Västerås.

References and notes

External links
Västmanland County Administrative Board
Västmanland County Council

 

 
Counties of Sweden
County
1634 establishments in Sweden
States and territories established in 1634